Sandwich Bay to Hacklinge Marshes is a  biological and geological Site of Special Scientific Interest which stretches between Deal and Sandwich in Kent. It includes two Geological Conservation Review sites, and most of it is a Nature Conservation Review site, Grade I. Part of it is a Ramsar site, a Special Area of Conservation, a Special Protection Area and a National Nature Reserve, It also includes a Kent Wildlife Trust nature reserve and a Local Nature Reserve,

This site has over 30 plant species and 168 invertebrates which are nationally rare and nationally scarce, and several wintering birds are present in nationally important numbers. It is also a geologically important site, with diverse fish fossils dating to  the Thanetian around 57 million years ago.

References

External links
 

Geological Conservation Review sites
Nature Conservation Review sites
National nature reserves in England
Ramsar sites in England
Sites of Special Scientific Interest in Kent
Sites of Special Scientific Interest notified in 1993
Special Areas of Conservation in England
Special Protection Areas in England
Kent coast